Pseudoliotia is a genus of sea snails, marine gastropod mollusks in the family Tornidae within the superfamily Truncatelloidea.

Species
Species within the genus Pseudoliotia include:

 Pseudoliotia acidalia (Melvill & Standen, 1899)
 Pseudoliotia anaglypta (A. Adams, 1863)
 Pseudoliotia asteriscus (Gould, 1859)
 Pseudoliotia axialis Laseron, 1958
 Pseudoliotia bellatula (W.-M. Feng, 1996)
 Pseudoliotia caelata (Garrett, 1873)
 Pseudoliotia calliglypta (Melvill, 1891)
 Pseudoliotia coronata Rubio & Rolán, 2018
 Pseudoliotia cristata (G. B. Sowerby III, 1900)
 Pseudoliotia dispersa Rubio & Rolán, 2018
 Pseudoliotia distincta Rubio & Rolán, 2018
 Pseudoliotia faceta Rubio & Rolán, 2018
 Pseudoliotia fijiensis Rubio & Rolán, 2018
 Pseudoliotia gabrielruedai Rubio & Rolán, 2018
 Pseudoliotia godeti (Dautzenberg & H. Fischer, 1907)
 Pseudoliotia gowllandi (Brazier, 1874)
 Pseudoliotia granulosa Kuroda & Habe, 1971
 Pseudoliotia hattenbergeri Rolán & Rubio, 2002
 Pseudoliotia henjamensis (Melvill & Standen, 1903)
 Pseudoliotia inanis Rubio & Rolán, 2018
 Pseudoliotia indicta Rubio & Rolán, 2018
 Pseudoliotia intermixta Rubio & Rolán, 2018
 Pseudoliotia linguifera (Thiele, 1925)
 Pseudoliotia micans (A. Adams, 1850)
 Pseudoliotia minor Rubio & Rolán, 2018
 † Pseudoliotia motobuensis MacNeil, 1961 
 Pseudoliotia nodenim Rubio & Rolán, 2018
 Pseudoliotia nodosa Rubio & Rolán, 2018
 Pseudoliotia ocrinium (Melvill & Standen, 1901)
 Pseudoliotia oscostata Rubio & Rolán, 2018
 Pseudoliotia philippinensis Rubio & Rolán, 2018
 Pseudoliotia philtata (Hedley, 1900)
 Pseudoliotia plurifunis Rubio & Rolán, 2018
 Pseudoliotia plusnodosa Rubio & Rolán, 2018
 Pseudoliotia pressa Rubio & Rolán, 2018
 Pseudoliotia profundi Rubio & Rolán, 2018
 Pseudoliotia pulchella (Dunker, 1860)
 Pseudoliotia radians (Laseron, 1958)
 Pseudoliotia reeviana (Hinds, 1843)
 Pseudoliotia rudispiralis Rubio & Rolán, 2018
 Pseudoliotia salva Rubio & Rolán, 2018
 Pseudoliotia sementis Rubio & Rolán, 2018
 Pseudoliotia seposita Rubio & Rolán, 2018
 Pseudoliotia speciosa (Angas, 1871)
 Pseudoliotia supremum (Melvill & Standen, 1903)
 Pseudoliotia teresae Rubio & Rolán, 2018
 Pseudoliotia tribulationis (Hedley, 1909)
 Pseudoliotia tropica Laseron, 1958
 Pseudoliotia supremum (Melvill & Standen, 1903)
 Pseudoliotia teresae Rubio & Rolán, 2018
 Pseudoliotia tribulationis (Hedley, 1909)
 Pseudoliotia tropica Laseron, 1958
 Pseudoliotia vicina Rubio & Rolán, 2018

Species brought into synonymy
 Pseudoliotia imperforata Suter, 1908: synonym of Argalista imperforata (Suter, 1908)
 Pseudoliotia liliputia Laseron, 1958: synonym of Pseudoliotia speciosa (Angas, 1871)

References

 Rubio F. & Rolán E. (2018). The genus Pseudoliotia Tate, 1898 (Gastropoda, Vitrinellidae) in the Tropical Indo-Pacific. Iberus. suppl. 7: 1-117

External links
 Tate R. (1898). On two deep-level deposits of newer Pleistocene in South Australia. Transactions of the Royal Society of South Australia. 22: 65-71
 Tate, R. (1899). A revision of the Australian Cyclostrematidae and Liotiidae. Transactions of the Royal Society of South Australia. 23(2): 213-229, pl. 6-7
 C. 1958. Liotiidae and allied molluscs from the Dampierian Zoogeographical Province. Records of the Australian Museum 24(11): 165-182, figs 1-87

 
Tornidae